Fayette County is a county located in the U.S. state of Ohio. As of the 2020 census, the population was 28,951. Its county seat and largest city is Washington Court House. The county was named for the Marquis de Lafayette, a Frenchman who was an officer in the American Army in the Revolution, when established on March 1, 1810.

Fayette County comprises the Washington Court House, OH Micropolitan Statistical Area, which is also included in the Columbus-Marion-Zanesville, OH Combined Statistical Area.

History
Fayette County was formed on March 1, 1810, from portions of Highland and Ross Counties. It was named after Marie-Joseph Motier, Marquis de La Fayette, a French general and politician who took the side of the Colonials during the American Revolutionary War and who played an important role in the French Revolution.

Parks

Trails
Tri-County Triangle Trail - This trail goes between Washington Court House and Chillicothe.

Clinton-Fayette Friendship Trail - This trail goes between Melvin to Borum RD and starts backup at Bush RD to Jamison RD.

Geography

Adjacent counties
 Madison County (north)
 Pickaway County (northeast)
 Ross County (southeast)
 Highland County (south)
 Clinton County (southwest)
 Greene County (northwest)

Major highways

Demographics

2000 census
As of the census of 2010, there were 29,030 people, 11,436 households, and 7,834 families living in the county. The population density was 71.4 people per square mile (27.6/km2). There were 12,693 housing units at an average density of 31.2 per square mile (12.1/km2). The racial makeup of the county was 94.63% White, 2.02% Black or African American, 0.23% Native American, 0.54% Asian, 0.03% Pacific Islander, 0.80% from other races, and 1.74% from two or more races. 1.79% of the population were Hispanic or Latino of any race.

There were 11,436 households, out of which 32.53% had children under the age of 18 living with them, 49.05% were married couples living together, 13.50% had a female householder with no husband present, and 31.50% were non-families. 25.80% of all households were made up of individuals, and 10.34% had someone living alone who was 65 years of age or older. The average household size was 2.49 and the average family size was 2.95.

In the county, the population was spread out, with 24.67% under the age of 18, 7.88% from 18 to 24, 24.89% from 25 to 44, 27.59% from 45 to 64, and 14.97% who were 65 years of age or older. The median age was 39.4 years. For every 100 females there were 96.69 males. For every 100 females age 18 and over, there were 93.56 males.

, the median income for a household in the county was $37,619, and the median income for a family was $45,108. Males had a median income of $30,516 versus $20,223 for females. The per capita income for the county was $20,603. About 16.1% of families and 20.1% of the population were below the poverty line, including 27.4% of those under age 18 and 9.1% of those age 65 or over.

2010 census
As of the 2010 United States Census, there were 29,030 people, 11,436 households, and 7,834 families living in the county. The racial makeup of the county was 94.6% white, 2.0% black or African American, 0.5% Asian, 0.2% American Indian, 0.8% from other races, and 1.7% from two or more races. Those of Hispanic or Latino origin made up 1.8% of the population. In terms of ancestry, 21.9% were German, 15.4% were American, 10.6% were Irish, and 9.7% were English.

Of the 11,436 households, 33.4% had children under the age of 18 living with them, 49.0% were married couples living together, 13.5% had a female householder with no husband present, 31.5% were non-families, and 25.8% of all households were made up of individuals. The average household size was 2.49 and the average family size was 2.95. The median age was 39.4 years.

The median income for a household in the county was $39,599 and the median income for a family was $48,424. Males had a median income of $39,078 versus $31,434 for females. The per capita income for the county was $20,525. About 12.9% of families and 17.4% of the population were below the poverty line, including 22.6% of those under age 18 and 9.6% of those age 65 or over.

Politics
Fayette County is a stronghold of the Republican party in presidential elections; it has voted Democratic only 4 times since 1856.

|}

Government

Fayette County has a 3-member Board of County Commissioners that oversee the various County departments, similar to all but 2 of the 88 Ohio counties. As of 2021, Fayette County's elected commissioners are Tony Anderson, Dan Dean, and Jim Garland.

Transportation

Airport
Fayette County Airport is a general aviation facility owned by the county and located northeast of the city of Washington Court House.

Communities

City
 Washington Court House (county seat)

Villages
 Bloomingburg
 Greenfield (partly in Highland and Ross Counties)
 Jeffersonville
 Milledgeville
 New Holland (partly in Pickaway County)
 Octa

Townships

 Concord
 Green
 Jasper
 Jefferson
 Madison
 Marion
 Paint
 Perry
 Union
 Wayne

https://web.archive.org/web/20160715023447/http://www.ohiotownships.org/township-websites

Census-designated places
 Good Hope
 Pancoastburg

Unincorporated communities

 Blessing
 Bookwalter
 Boyds
 Buena Vista
 Cook
 Cunningham
 Eber
 Edgefield
 Fairview
 Georgetown
 Ghormley
 Glendon
 Hagler
 Jasper Mills
 Johnson
 Luray
 Luttrell
 Madison Mills
 Manara
 McLean
 New Martinsburg
 Parrott
 Plano
 Pleasant View
 Rock Mills
 Shady Grove
 South Plymouth
 Staunton
 West Lancaster
 White Oak
 Yankeetown
 Yatesville

See also
 National Register of Historic Places listings in Fayette County, Ohio

References

 
1810 establishments in Ohio
Populated places established in 1810